Oviedo Cove is a cove at the northeast end of Seymour Island, southeast of Cape Wiman. The cove was named "Caleta Oviedo" in 1979 after an Argentine sailor who died in the Antarctic. Applied by the names commission, Argentine Ministry of Defense.

References 

Coves of Graham Land
Landforms of the James Ross Island group